Terry Porter (born 1963) is an American college basketball coach and former player.

Terry Porter may also refer to:

 Terry Porter (athlete) (born 1951), American Olympic athlete
 Terry Porter (cross-country skier) (born 1953), American Olympic cross-country skier
 Terry Porter (sound engineer) (born 1954), American sound engineer